Capitol University Medical Center (formerly Cagayan Capitol General Hospital Foundation Incorporated) in Cagayan de Oro, Philippines, is the Base Hospital for the Capitol University. This private hospital is one of the largest and leading private medical facilities in Mindanao. In 2009, the new and expanded CUMC opened its doors to hundreds offering sects to affiliate in this bustling hospital. Capitol University Medical Center stands as the base training of Capitol University's College of Nursing and College of Midwifery students in this medical center.

References

External links
 Capitol University Official Website

Hospital buildings completed in 1978
Buildings and structures in Cagayan de Oro
Hospitals established in 2008
Teaching hospitals in the Philippines
20th-century architecture in the Philippines